Henry Jones (1790 – January 21, 1860) was a merchant and political figure in Upper Canada. He represented Brockville in the Legislative Assembly of Upper Canada from 1830 to 1834 as a Conservative.

He was born in the United States, the son of Joseph Jones. Jones married Lucy Catherine Macdonell. He lived in Brockville. He served in the Leeds militia and was a justice of the peace for the Johnstown District. He was also postmaster for Brockville.

Jones was a cousin of Jonas and Charles Jones, who both also served in the assembly.

References 

1790 births
1860 deaths
Members of the Legislative Assembly of Upper Canada
History of Leeds and Grenville United Counties